Bangalore Tech Summit or previously Bangalore IT.in is an Indian technology exhibition. It is held annually sometime between October to December in Palace grounds, Bangalore, India. The name of this event was changed from BangaloreIT.com to BangaloreIT.in starting with the 2005 edition. In 2018, it was renamed to Bengaluru tech summit. The event is an initiative of the Department of IT & Biotechnology of the State Government of Karnataka, India.

The event is supported by Indian trade consortiums such as the National Association of Software and Services Companies, and government bodies such as the Software Technology Parks of India.

External links
Bengaluru Tech Summit, Dept. of IT & BT, Government of Karnataka, India
Bangalore IT.in 2007
Department of IT, Biotechnology and Science & Technology. State government of Karnataka, India

Computer-related trade shows
Trade fairs in India
Information technology industry of Bangalore